Otodus angustidens is a species of prehistoric megatoothed sharks in the genus Otodus, which lived during the Oligocene and Miocene epochs about 33 to 22 million years ago. This shark is related to another extinct megatoothed shark, Otodus megalodon.

Taxonomy 
The Swiss naturalist Louis Agassiz, first identified this shark as a species of genus Carcharodon in 1835.

In 1964, shark expert, L. S. Glikman recognized the transition of Otodus obliquus to C. auriculatus and moved C. angustidens to genus Otodus. (See "external links" below)

However, in 1987, shark expert H. Cappetta recognized the C. auriculatus - C. megalodon lineage and placed all related megatooth sharks along with this species in the genus Carcharocles. The complete Otodus obliquus to C. megalodon transition then became clear and has since gained the acceptance of many other experts with the passage of time. Within the Carcharocles lineage, C. angustidens is the species succeeding C. sokolovi and is followed by C. chubutensis.

In 2001, a discovery of the best preserved Carcharocles angustidens specimen to date by two scientists, Michael D. Gottfried and Ewan Fordyce, has been presented by the team as evidence for close morphological ties with the extant great white shark, and the team argued that Carcharocles angustidens, along with all other related megatooth sharks, including Carcharocles megalodon, should be assigned to Carcharodon as was done before by Louis Agassiz., although this is not internationally accepted by the scientific community.

Size estimation 

Dentition 
The dental formula for O. angustidens is

Diet 
O. angustidens was an apex predator and likely preyed upon penguins, fish, dolphins, and baleen whales.

Fossil record 
As is the case with most extinct sharks, this species is also known from fossil teeth and some fossilized vertebral centra. Shark skeletons are composed of cartilage and not bone, and cartilage rarely gets fossilized. Hence, fossils of O. angustidens are generally poorly preserved. To date, the best preserved specimen of this species have been excavated from New Zealand, which comprises 165 associated teeth and about 35 associated vertebral centra. This specimen is around 26 million years old. O. angustidens teeth are noted for their triangular crowns and small side cusps that are fully serrated. The serrations are very sharp and very well pronounced. O. angustidens was a widely distributed species with fossils found in: A fossil bed in South Carolina suggests that O. angustidens utilized the area as a birthing ground and nursery for their pups, as 89% of the teeth found in the area belonged to juveniles, 3% belonged to infants, and 8% belonged to adults.

North America
 Yazoo Formation, Alabama
 Jewett Sand Formation, California
 Clinchfield Formation, Georgia
 Calvert Formation, Maryland
 Jackson Group, Mississippi
 Kirkwood Formation, New Jersey
 Castle Hayne Formation, North Carolina
 Hawthorne Formation, South Carolina
 Chandler Bridge Formation, South Carolina

Europe
 Malta 
 Paris Basin, France
 Leipzig / Stoermthal, Germany
Asia
 Ashiya Group, Japan

Oceania
 Ettric, Jan Juc, Gambier Limestone, Clifton Formations, Australia
 Otekaike Formation, New Zealand

Africa

South America
 Dos Bocas Formation, Ecuador

See also 

 Prehistoric fish
 Largest prehistoric organisms

References

Further reading 
 Glikman, L.S., 1980. Evolution of Cretaceous and Caenozoic Lamnoid Sharks:3-247, pls.1-33. Moscow.
 Jordan, D.S. & Hannibal, H., 1923. Fossil Sharks and Rays of the Pacific Slope of North America. Bulletin of the Southern California Academy of Sciences, 22:27-63, plates 1–9.

External links 
 A large extinct white shark: Carcharodon angustidens from New Zealand Oligocene rocks.
 Carcharocles: Extinct Megatoothed shark

angustidens
Oligocene sharks
Miocene sharks
Chattian species first appearances
Aquitanian species extinctions
Fossils of Australia
Paleogene Ecuador
Fossils of Ecuador
Fossils of France
Fossils of Japan
Fossils of New Zealand
Paleogene United States
Fossils of Georgia (U.S. state)
Fossils of Mississippi
Fossils of New Jersey
Fossils of North Carolina
Fossils of South Carolina
Fossil taxa described in 1843
Taxa named by Louis Agassiz